Caracal is a city in Olt county, Romania, situated in the historic region of Oltenia, on the plains between the lower reaches of the Jiu and Olt rivers. The region's plains are well known for their agricultural specialty in cultivating grains and over the centuries, Caracal has been the trading center for the region's agricultural output. Caracal has a population of approximately 31,000 and is the second largest city in the region.

Etymology
While 19th century historians thought that the name of Caracal is linked to Roman Emperor Caracalla, the current accepted etymology is that city's name is derived from the Cuman language kara kale meaning "Black fortress" (kara, meaning "black", and kal, either from the Turkish kale, or the Arabic qal'at, both meaning fortress).

History
The end of the 19th century and the first half of the 20th century saw Caracal experience significant growth and the region become one of the most important agricultural regions in Romania. Caracal was this region's capital and seat of Romanați County. World War II and the communist regime brought changes to this region and to the city of Caracal. During World War II a Nazi concentration camp was located near the city. The communist government, which disestablished Romanați County, instituted industrialization plans and Caracal experienced continued economic growth through the establishment of industrial plants in the textile industry sector.

The town underwent major changes after the Nicolae Ceaușescu regime was overthrown by the December 1989 Revolution, with many factories collapsing under the pressure of privatisation.

Demographics

Natives
 Gheorghe Argeșanu
 Marius Bunescu
 Virgil Carianopol
 Dan Diaconescu
 Aurelian Titu Dumitrescu
 Iancu Jianu
 Haralamb Lecca 
 Radu Șerban
 Marius Tucă
 Pirjol 'Zombilau' Alexandru

References

External links

 Caracal Museum

Cities in Romania
Populated places in Olt County
Localities in Oltenia
Capitals of former Romanian counties